The 2021–22 Pac-12 Conference women's basketball season began with practices in October followed by the 2021–22 NCAA Division I women's basketball season which started on November 9. Conference play began on December 31. This is the tenth season under the Pac–12 Conference name and the 36th since the conference first sponsored women's sports, including basketball, in the 1986–87 school year. 

The Pac-12 tournament took place from March 2–6 at the Michelob Ultra Arena in Paradise, Nevada.

Pre-season

Recruiting classes

Preseason watchlists
Below is a table of notable preseason watch lists.

Preseason All-American teams

Preseason polls

Pac-12 Media days
The Pac-12 will conduct its 2021 Pac-12 media days at the Pac-12 Studio, in San Francisco, California, on October 13, 2021 (Pac-12 Network).

The teams and representatives in respective order were as follows:

 Pac-12 Commissioner – George Kliavkoff
 Deputy Commissioner and Chief Operating Officer(MBB) – Jamie Zaninovich
 Arizona –
 Arizona State –
 California –
 Colorado – 
 Oregon –
 Oregon State – 
 Stanford –
 UCLA –
 USC –  
 Utah –  
 Washington –  
 Washington State –  

Source:

Source:

Pac-12 Preseason All-Conference

Honorable Mention Kennedy Brown (OSU); Gina Conti (UCLA); Natalie Chou (UCLA); Dalayah Daniels (CAL); Dru Gylten (UTAH); Taya Hanson (ASU); Krystal Leger-Walker (WSU) Brynna Maxwell (UTAH); Nancy Mulkey (WASH); Jaylyn Sherrod (COLO); Anna Wilson (STAN).

Midseason watchlists
Below is a table of notable midseason watch lists.

Final watchlists
Below is a table of notable year end watch lists.

Regular season
The Schedule will be released in late October. Before the season, it was announced that for the seventh consecutive season, all regular season conference games and conference tournament games would be broadcast nationally by ESPN Inc. family of networks including ABC, ESPN, ESPN2 and ESPNU, and the Pac-12 Network.

Early season tournaments

Records against other conferences
2021–22 records against non-conference foes as of (November 27, 2021):

Regular Season

Post Season

Record against ranked non-conference opponents
This is a list of games against ranked opponents only (rankings from the AP Poll):

Team rankings are reflective of AP poll when the game was played, not current or final ranking

† denotes game was played on neutral site

Conference schedule
This table summarizes the head-to-head results between teams in conference play.

Points scored

Through January 23, 2022

Rankings

Head coaches

Coaching changes

Coaches
Note: Stats shown are before the beginning of the season. Pac-12 records are from time at current school. 

Notes:
 Pac-12 records, conference titles, etc. are from time at current school and are through the end the 2020–21 season.
 NCAA tournament appearances are from time at current school only.
 NCAA Final Fours and Championship include time at other schools

Post season

Pac-12 tournament

The conference tournament was played from March 2–6 at the Michelob Ultra Arena in Paradise, NV. The top four teams had a bye on the first day. Teams were seeded by conference record, with ties broken by record between the tied teams followed by record against the regular-season champion, if necessary.

NCAA tournament

Teams from the conference were selected to participate:

Women's National Invitation Tournament 
Number from the conference were selected to participate:

Awards and honors

Players of the Week 
Throughout the regular season, the Pac-12 offices honor 2 players based on performance by naming them player of the week and freshman of the week.

Totals per School

All-Americans

All-District
The United States Basketball Writers Association (USBWA) named the following from the Pac-12 to their All-District Teams:

District VIII

All-District Team

District IX
Player of the Year

All-District Team

Conference awards
The Pac-12 presents two separate sets of major awards—one voted on by conference coaches and the other by media.

Individual awards

Coaches

Media

All-Pac-12

First Team

 ‡ Pac-12 Player of the Year
 ††† three-time All-Pac-12 First Team honoree
 †† two-time All-Pac-12 First Team honoree
 † two-time All-Pac-12 honoree

Honorable Mention:
Jayda Curry, (CAL, G)
Krystal Leger-Walker, (WSU, G)
Kennady McQueen, (UTAH, G)
Quay Miller, (COLO, C)
Nancy Mulkey, (WASH, F)
Jordan Sanders, (USC, F)
Sam Thomas, (ARIZ, G/F)
Haley Van Dyke, (WASH, F)

All-Freshman Team

† Pac-12 Player of the Year
‡ Pac-12 Freshman of the Year
Honorable Mention
Izzy Anstey, (UCLA, F)
Kiki Iriafen, (STAN, F)
Greta Kampschroeder, (OSU, G)

All-Defensive Team

† Pac-12 Player of the Year
‡Pac-12 Defensive Player of the Year
†† two-time Pac-12 All-Defensive Team honoree
Honorable Mention
Taya Corosdale, (OSU, G/F)
Mael Gilles, (ASU, F)
Krystal Leger-Walker, (WSU, G)
Rayah Marshall, (USC, G/F)
Leilani McIntosh, (CAL, G)
Nancy Mulkey, (WASH, C)
Charisma Osborne, (UCLA, G)
Helena Pueyo, (ARIZ, G)
Jordan Sanders, (USC, F)
Maddie Scherr, (ORE, G)
Haley Van Dyke, (WASH, F)

Scholar Athlete of the year
The Pac-12 moved to seasonal Academic Honor Rolls, discontinuing sport-by-sport teams, starting in 2019-20

‡ indicates player was Pac-12 Scholar-Athlete of the Year
†† two-time Pac-12 All-Academic honoree
††† three-time Pac-12 All-Academic honoree

National awards

2022 WNBA draft

Home game attendance 

Bold – At or exceed capacity
†Season high

See also
2021–22 Pac-12 Conference men's basketball season

References